Heavy is the second album by the rapper Heavy D, released in 1999 via Uptown Records. It was produced by Heavy D, Tony Dofat, Erick Sermon, Jay Dee and Q-Tip. The album was a minor success, making it to #60 on the Billboard 200 and #10 on the Top R&B/Hip-Hop Albums chart.  It is Heavy D's lowest-selling album, at a little over 500,000 units sold. 

Guests on the album include Cee-Lo, Q-Tip, Chico DeBarge, Big Pun and Eightball. Two music videos were made: "Don't Stop" (directed by Diane Martel) and "On Point" f/Big Pun & Eightball.

Critical reception
The Village Voice called the album "closer to Bowie’s Low than to P.M. Dawn, elegiac tone poems like 'Ask Heaven' and 'Dancin’ in the Night' stretch rap’s definition well beyond typical r&b structures." The Orlando Sentinel wrote that "the New Yorker's production contains a winning combination of rocklike, sultry and R&B tracks." The New Pittsburgh Courier deemed it D's "most personal album to date," writing that "the range of topics and themes go from 'go-for-yours' party jams to songs dealing with grief, loss and pain."

Track listing
"Like Dat Dhere"- 3:37
"Imagine That"- 3:51
"You Know" feat, Cee-Lo- 3:51
"Listen" feat. Q-Tip- 3:26
"Don't Stop"- 4:03
"Dancin' in the middle of the Night"- 4:15
"Ask Heaven" feat. Chico DeBarge- 4:36
"On Point" feat. Big Pun & 8 Ball- 4:37
"Spanish Fly"- 3:39
"I Know You Love Me"- 2:16
"I Don't Think So"- 3:34
"You Nasty Hev"- 3:25

Samples
"Listen" samples "Fly Like an Eagle" by Steve Miller Band

"Don't Stop" samples "Look Alike" by Bob James

"Ask Heaven" samples "Stairway to Heaven" by Led Zeppelin

"On Point" samples "You Make Me Feel Like This (When You Touch Me)" by Love Unlimited Orchestra

"You Nasty Hev" samples "La Di Da Di" by Doug E. Fresh & Slick Rick

References

Heavy D albums
1999 albums
Universal Records albums
Albums produced by Q-Tip (musician)
Albums produced by Erick Sermon
Albums produced by J Dilla